Troy Lee Coleman III (born December 18, 1970), better known by his stage name Cowboy Troy, is an American rapper and singer. He is best known as a representative of the country rap genre. He has released seven studio albums and one EP, including three releases on Warner Bros. Records, and has charted twice on the Billboard country singles charts.

Early life
Coleman was born in Victoria, Texas, on December 18, 1970. He graduated from Skyline High School in the Dallas Independent School District. Coleman then attended the University of Texas at Austin where he earned a bachelor's degree. Prior to beginning his career as a singer, he worked as the assistant manager of a Dallas area Foot Locker.

He got the name Cowboy Troy in college, after a friend used the name to distinguish the cowboy-hat-wearing Coleman from his other friends named Troy.

Career
On May 17, 2005, Troy released his first major-label solo album, Loco Motive, through the RAYBAW records production label and the Warner Music Group distribution label. The album debuted at No. 2 on Billboard's Top Country Albums chart. The first single, "I Play Chicken with the Train," peaked at No. 48 on Billboard's Hot Country Songs chart on April 9, 2005 and was the No. 1 country download at the iTunes Music Store on April 15, 2005.

As a Chevrolet promotion, Troy, Wilson, and Big & Rich released "Our America" as a free, time-limited download on July 1, 2005. They also performed the song live at the Boston Pops concert on July 4, 2005. "Our America" combines "The Star-Spangled Banner" with spoken word of parts of the U.S. Constitution, Declaration of independence, Pledge of Allegiance and Martin Luther King Jr.'s 1963 "I Have a Dream" speech. The song peaked at No. 44 on Billboard's Hot Country Songs chart, and appears as a bonus track on both Big & Rich's Comin' to Your City and Wilson's All Jacked Up albums.

Cowboy Troy released the single "If You Don't Wanna Love Me", a duet with Sarah Buxton. The single failed to chart, as did the follow-up, "My Last Yee Haw." A promotional single, titled "Hook 'Em Horns", was released on February 14, 2006 after his alma mater (the Texas Longhorns) won the national championship in football.

2006-present
Cowboy Troy co-hosted, with Jewel, the fifth season of Nashville Star on the USA Network and CMT Canada.

Troy made a special appearance at the March 13, 2006 episode of WWE's RAW in Beaumont, Texas. He came to the announcer's table and helped announce for the match between superstars Edge and Goldust. His entrance music was "My Last Yee Haw." The April 30 episode of WWE's Raw, broadcast from Nashville, showed Troy in the crowd. The announcers mentioned him, and his duties hosting Nashville Star. In 2007, he released Black in the Saddle.

Troy parted ways with Warner Bros. Nashville in 2008. He released Demolition Mission: Studio Blue Sessions in 2009. Troy returned to Warner Music Nashville to release "King of Clubs" in March 2014.

Cowboy Troy was cited as a featured guest artist on two tracks from the 2011 Vanilla Ice release titled WTF, which is available on iTunes.

In 2012, Troy appeared on the May 21 and 22 finale of Season 14 of the television show Dancing with the Stars, performing "I Play Chicken With the Train."

His 2017 single "Pork Chop" was named as the theme for the National Pork Board's October promotion called "Porktober".

Troy starred in the 2022 Western film Desperate Riders.

Personal life
Cowboy Troy performed at the 2008 Republican National Convention in St. Paul, Minnesota. He is a self-described black conservative and a member of the Republican Party who supported Senator John McCain in the 2008 U.S. presidential election

Discography

Studio albums

Extended plays

Singles

Other charted songs

Music videos

See also
 Black conservatism in the United States

References

External links

1970 births
African-American male rappers
American country singers
Living people
Skyline High School (Dallas) alumni
Musicians from Dallas
Pop rappers
People from Victoria, Texas
Warner Records artists
Rappers from Dallas
Texas Republicans
Country rap musicians
Country musicians from Texas
African-American country musicians
African-American male singers
Singer-songwriters from Texas
African-American male songwriters
21st-century American rappers
21st-century African-American musicians
20th-century African-American people